Ravidasvir (PPI-668) is an investigational NS5A inhibitor (by Pharco Pharmaceuticals) in clinical trials for chronic hepatitis C genotype 4.

Preliminary clinical trial results were announced in Nov 2015.  In April 2017, press reports stated that a combination treatment involving ravidasvir and sofosbuvir had achieved a 97% clearup rate against hepatitis C in a clinical trial conducted in Malaysia and Thailand, and 100% in another conducted in Egypt. It has been granted conditional registration by the National Pharmaceutical Regulatory Agency (NPRA) of Malaysia.

See also
 Discovery and development of NS5A inhibitors

References

Experimental drugs
Gilead Sciences
NS5A inhibitors